A list of churches and church buildings in Hampshire, England (including the unitary authorities of Southampton and Portsmouth) listed by borough:

Basingstoke and Deane
Sandham Memorial Chapel
St Michael's Church, Basingstoke
St Lawrence's Church, Weston Patrick
RCCG Rehoboth Chapel, Basingstoke

East Hampshire
All Saints' Church, Alton
Church of St Lawrence, Alton
All Saints Church, East Meon
St Peter's Church, Petersfield

Eastleigh
St Mary's Church, Bishopstoke
Emmanuel Baptist Church, Eastleigh
King's Community Church
St John's Church, Hedge End
St Nicolas' Church, North Stoneham

Hart
All Saints Church, Crondall
All Saints Church, Odiham

New Forest
Beaulieu Abbey

Rushmoor
 Cathedral of St Michael and St George, Aldershot
 Church of St Michael the Archangel, Aldershot
 Royal Garrison Church (Aldershot)
 St Andrew's Garrison Church, Aldershot
 St Joseph's Church, Aldershot
 Holy Trinity Church, Aldershot
 New Testament Church of God, Aldershot
 St John's Church, Farnborough
" St Michaels Church, Farnborough

Portsmouth
ChristCentral Church Portsmouth
Domus Dei
Mountain of Fire and Miracles, Portsmouth
Portsmouth Cathedral
Cathedral of St John the Evangelist, Portsmouth
Southwick Priory

Southampton
Above Bar Church
Avenue St Andrew's United Reformed Church
Central Baptist Church
Christ Church, Freemantle
City Life Church
Highfield Church
Holyrood Church, Southampton
Jesus Chapel, Peartree Green
Shirley Baptist Church
Shirley Parish Church
St Alban's Church, Southampton
St Edmund Church, Southampton
St Joseph Church, Southampton
St. Mark's Church, Woolston
St. Mary's Church, Southampton
St. Mary's Church, South Stoneham
St. Mary's Presbyterian Church, Woolston (demolished 1972)
St. Michael's Church, Southampton
St. Michael and All Angels Church, Bassett
St. Patrick's Church, Woolston
Swaythling Methodist Church

Test Valley
Romsey Abbey

Winchester
New Minster, Winchester
Old Minster, Winchester
Winchester Cathedral
Christ Church, Winchester
Holy Trinity Church, Winchester
St John the Baptist Church, Winchester
St Lawrence Church, Winchester
St Swithun-upon-Kingsgate Church, Winchester
St Mary's Church, Twyford

References

Diocese of Guildford information. Anglicans Online Official Website. Retrieval Date: December 5, 2007.
Guilford Diocesan Website. Retrieval Date: 5 December 2007.
Diocese of Oxford information. Anglicans Online Official Website. Retrieval Date: December 5, 2007.
Oxford Diocesan Website. Retrieval Date: 5 December 2007.
Diocese of Portsmouth information. Anglicans Online Official Website. Retrieval Date: December 5, 2007.
Portsmouth Diocesan Website. Retrieval Date: 5 December 2007.
Diocese of Salisbury information. Anglicans Online Official Website. Retrieval Date: December 5, 2007.
Salisbury Diocesan Website. Retrieval Date: 5 December 2007.
Diocese of Winchester information. Anglicans Online Official Website. Retrieval Date: December 5, 2007.
Winchester Diocesan Website. Retrieval Date: 5 December 2007.

 
Hampshire
Churches in Hampshire